Undoo Hoda Kondoo Hoda (Kannada:ಉಂಡೂ ಹೋದ ಕೊಂಡೂ ಹೋದ) is a 1992 Indian Kannada-language satirical film directed and written by Nagathihalli Chandrashekar, making his debut in film direction. The film stars Ananth Nag, Tara and Anjali Sudhakar, whilst Umesh, Tennis Krishna, Vijay Kashi and Maanu feature in other prominent roles. The film was produced under the Padmamba Combines banner.

The film's plot deals with a "cow" inspector played by Ananth Nag who comes to a village from city and plays his tricks on the innocent minds of the villagers and wins over them by cheating. The sequence that unfolds later are shown in a comical way. Nagathihalli won the Best story writer award at the Karnataka State Film Awards.

Cast
 Anant Nag as Krishna
 Tara 
 Anjali Sudhakar
 Tennis Krishna as Girisha "Kamangi"
 Umesh
 Vijay Kashi
 Maanu
 Shimoga Venkatesh
 Girija Lokesh
 Karibasavaiah
 Dingri Nagaraj
 Nagathihalli Chandrashekar in a cameo appearance

Soundtrack
The music of the film was composed by Vijaya Bhaskar. All the lyrics except one were written by Nagathihalli Chandrashekar. A poem of K. S. Narasimhaswamy was included in the soundtrack.

Awards
 Best Story Writer - Nagathihalli Chandrashekar

References

1992 films
1990s Kannada-language films
Indian comedy films
Indian satirical films
Films scored by Vijaya Bhaskar
1992 directorial debut films
1992 comedy films
1990s satirical films
Films directed by Nagathihalli Chandrashekhar